Mats Berglind (195223 September 2016) was a Swedish politician and member of the Riksdag, the national legislature. A member of the Social Democratic Party, he represented Uppsala County between October 1998 and October 2010. He was also a substitute member of the Riksdag for Thomas Östros between March 1996 and October 1998. He died on 23 September 2016 aged 64.

References

1952 births
2016 deaths
Members of the Riksdag 1998–2002
Members of the Riksdag 2002–2006
Members of the Riksdag 2006–2010
Members of the Riksdag from the Social Democrats